Schefflera seibertii is a species of plant in the family Araliaceae. It is found in Costa Rica and Panama.

References

seibertii
Data deficient plants
Taxonomy articles created by Polbot
Taxobox binomials not recognized by IUCN